Ramanka is a village and former salute Rajput princely state on Saurashtra Gujarat, western India.

History 
The petty princely state, in Gohilwar prant, was ruled by Gohil Rajput Chieftains.Ramanka was a taluk of Devani Gohil family. Ramanka was statuated in 1870 by Raol Shree Abhayrajsinghji Gohil, who was son of Raol Shree Devajibapu Gohil of Pacchegam. In 1901 it comprised a single village, with a population of 470, yielding 3,20,000 rupees state revenue (1903-4, nearly all from land), paying 672 rupees tribute, to the Gaikwar Baroda State and Junagadh State.

An article of Arjun Sinh Jadeja (Makaji Meghpar)

References

Sources and external links 
History
 Imperial Gazetteer, on DSAL.UChicago.edu - Kathiawar

Princely states of Gujarat
Rajput princely states